The Consensus 2002 College Basketball All-American team, as determined by aggregating the results of four major All-American teams.  To earn "consensus" status, a player must win honors from a majority of the following teams: the Associated Press, the USBWA, The Sporting News and the National Association of Basketball Coaches.

2002 Consensus All-America team

Individual All-America teams

AP Honorable Mention:

 Tommy Adams, Hampton
 Luboš Bartoň, Valparaiso
 Lonny Baxter, Maryland
 Troy Bell, Boston College
 Steve Blake, Maryland
 Brett Blizzard, UNC Wilmington
 Matt Bonner, Florida
 Curtis Borchardt, Stanford
 Caron Butler, Connecticut
 Nick Collison, Kansas
 Jason Conley, VMI
 Josh Davis, Wyoming
 Patrick Doctor, American
 Henry Domercant, Eastern Illinois
 Corsley Edwards,  Central Connecticut
 Melvin Ely, Fresno State
 Jason Erickson, Montana State
 Reggie Evans, Iowa
 T. J. Ford, Texas
 Jerry Green, UC Irvine
 Lynn Greer, Temple
 Rod Grizzard, Alabama
 Anthony Grundy, NC State
 Rylan Hainje, Butler
 Jarvis Hayes, Georgia
 Paul Haynes, Grambling State
 Kirk Hinrich, Kansas
 Fred Jones, Oregon
 Jason Kapono, UCLA
 Kyle Korver, Creighton
 Greg Lewis, Winthrop
 John Linehan, Providence
 Chris Marcus, Western Kentucky
 Keith McLeod, Bowling Green
 Ugonna Onyekwe, Penn
 Mario Porter, Rider
 McEverett Powers, UTSA
 Hollis Price, Oklahoma
 Luke Recker, Iowa
 Luke Ridnour, Oregon
 Héctor Romero, New Orleans
 Kareem Rush, Missouri
 Predrag Savović, Hawaii
 Preston Shumpert, Syracuse
 Darius Songaila, Wake Forest
 T. J. Sorrentine, Vermont
 Thomas Terrell, Georgia State
 Dwyane Wade, Marquette
 Dajuan Wagner, Memphis
 Luke Walton, Arizona
 Frank Williams, Illinois

References

NCAA Men's Basketball All-Americans
All-Americans